Over 800 reports were made publicly during the 1947 flying disc craze.   Such reports quickly spread throughout the United States, and some  sources estimate the reports may have numbered in the thousands.

Table

  Index number from Bloecher (1967)

References

June 1947 events in the United States
July 1947 events in the United States
Aviation accidents and incidents in the United States in 1947
1940s fads and trends
Folklore studies
Religious studies
UFO sightings in the United States
Flying saucers
1947 flying disc craze